Gila Bend Municipal Airport  is  east of Gila Bend, in Maricopa County, Arizona, United States.

Facilities
It has one runway:

 4/22 is 5,200 by 75 feet (1,585 x 23 m) asphalt.

It has a VORTAC (116.60 MHz), and it is a lighted land airport.

In the year ending April 19, 2008 the airport had 3,500 general aviation aircraft operations, average 10 per day. No aircraft were then based at the airport.

References

External links 

 

Airports in Maricopa County, Arizona